Cuijk is a railway station located in Cuijk, Netherlands. The station was opened on 1 June 1883 and is located on the Maaslijn (Nijmegen–Venlo). The train services are operated by Arriva.

Train services
The following local train services call at this station:
Stoptrein: Nijmegen–Venlo–Roermond
Stoptrein: Nijmegen–Venray

Bus services
91: Haps–Mill–Odiliapeel–Volkel–Uden, operated by Arriva.
92: Grave–Mill–Haps–Cuijk–Oeffelt–Gennep–Oeffelt–Boxmeer–Overloon–Venray, operated by Arriva.

External links
NS website 
Dutch public transport travel planner 

Railway stations in North Brabant
Railway stations opened in 1883
Railway stations on the Maaslijn
Buildings and structures in Land van Cuijk
Transport in Land van Cuijk